Ypsolopha mucronella is a moth of the family Ypsolophidae. It is found from Europe, through Siberia to Japan and in Asia Minor.

The wingspan is 26–33 mm. The forewings are narrow, apex very strongly and acutely produced; light brownish-ochreous, with scattered black scales, veins obscurely whitish; a dark fuscous streak along fold from base to beyond middle; sometimes other dark streaks between veins; a raised dark fuscous dot beneath fold before middle. Hindwings are pale whitish-fuscous.
The larva is greenish-grey, marbled with rosy-ochreous; dorsal line whitish; 3 and 4 with pairs of black spots.

Adults are on wing from August to April.

The larvae feed on Euonymus species, including Euonymus europaeus.

References

External links
 UK Moths
 New Records Of Yponomeutoid Moths (Lepidoptera, Yponomeutidae, Plutellidae) From Israel

Ypsolophidae
Moths described in 1763
Moths of Europe
Moths of Asia
Taxa named by Giovanni Antonio Scopoli